Fratta Polesine is a comune (municipality) in the Province of Rovigo in the Italian region Veneto, located about  southwest of Venice and about  southwest of Rovigo. Its main attraction is Andrea Palladio's Villa Badoer.

Fratta Polesine is the birthplace of the Italian socialist politician Giacomo Matteotti, opponent of Fascism.

Twin towns
  Tulcea, Romania
 Conversano, Italy
 Trecenta, Italy
 Recanati, Italy
 Palazzolo Acreide, Italy

See also
Frattesina

References

External links 

 Official website

Cities and towns in Veneto